Surajudeen Ajibola Basiru (born 1 July 1972) was a former  Attorney General and Commissioner for Justice for Osun State in Nigeria. He also served as Commissioner in the Ministry of Regional Integration & Special Duties from August 2010 - November 2014.  He was once a Lecturer in Osun State University November, 2014 - May 2017. 

Basiru, is the Senator representing Osun Central Senatorial District under the platform of the ruling All Progressives Congress (APC) and was appointed the Chairman Senate Committee on Diaspora, Non-Governmental Organizations and Civil Societies. He was later meritoriously appointed  as the Chairman, Senate Committee on Media and Public Affairs (Senate Spokesperson).

Basiru is a member of the following Senate Committees:

 Committee on Airforce
 Committee on Downstream Petroleum Sector
 Committee on Judiciary, Human Rights and Legal Matters
 Committee on Petroleum Resources (Upstream)
 Committee on States and Local Governments

Law career 
Basiru was admitted into the University of Ilorin to study Arabic and Islamic Studies but was rusticated in his third year. He received an admission to study Law at the University of Lagos, Akoka, Yaba, Lagos for L.L.B. (Hons) Bachelor Of Laws from 1994-2000.

He attended The Nigeria Law School, Bwari, Abuja, FCT. (2001-2002) and had a Second Class, Upper Division. From 2005-2006 he attended University of Lagos, LLM (Master Of Laws) Degree in Secured Credit Transactions; Planning & Compulsory Acquisition; Law of the Sea and Comparative Company Law. In 2016, Basiru also had his Ph.D in Property Law, Faculty of Law, at the University of Lagos.

Political career 
Basiru is representing Osun Central Senatorial District as a senator  under the platform of the ruling party All Progressives Congress (APC). He was a member of the Alliance for Democracy (AD), and has been in the party through its metamorphosis to Action Congress (AC), Action Congress of Nigeria (ACN) and now the All Progressives Congress (APC). He was a commissioner during the administration of Ogbeni Rauf Aregbesola, and also served in the first term as Honorable Commissioner of Regional Integration and Special Duties. Later, in the second term, he was appointed as the Honorable Attorney General and Commissioner for Justice for the state.

On 28 April 2020, Basiru was  appointed as the  new chairman of the Senate Committee on Media and Public Affairs by the Senate President Ahmad Lawan.

References 

Osun State politicians
1972 births
Living people